Oxford Community Schools is a school district headquartered in Oxford, Michigan.

The district serves portions of northeastern Oakland County and southwestern Lapeer County. In Oakland County, it serves Oxford, Leonard, most of Oxford Township, and portions of Addison and Brandon townships. In Lapeer County, the district serves sections of Dryden and Metamora townships.

History

Chinese international student program
In 2010, the district established a program so that international students from China could pay tuition and study at Oxford Community Schools. The school district placed some students with American host families, while the majority of the students who came as part of the Weiming Education Group lived in a residence hall at Rochester College. At one point, the district had 80 Chinese national international students. The district had a Confucius Institute-related program, and in 2013 the operator of the program, the Hanban ranked the district "Confucius Classroom of the Year". At first, the presence of Chinese students had no controversy in the district community. The district had Chinese students for two years, with Chinese students required to take university courses so they could stay for the second year, with courses taking place at Oxford High School.

William Skilling, then the superintendent, supported a proposal to establish a 200-student dormitory so the district could educate international students from China as part of a partnership with Weiming. The dormitory was to be  in size. The condition was that Oxford schools had to attract at least 100 Chinese students, which by 2017 the district maintained. A group of area residents opposed the proposal, which surfaced in October 2014. Skilling approved the proposal because it could generate income for the district.

In December 2014, Skilling said he planned to retire on August 31, 2015. On February 11, 2015, the school board approved the dormitory deal, which was in a 20-year contract. Five members voted for it, and one voted against it. In May 2015, the school board immediately designated Tim Throne as the superintendent and canceled Skilling's contract. By November 2015, the Department of Homeland Security said Oxford Schools could from this point forward only house each Chinese international student for one year, with remaining two-year program students grandfathered in and taking their university courses at Rochester University.

COVID-19 pandemic

In November 2021, the school board considered refusing to follow the statewide mask mandate during the COVID-19 pandemic.

2021 shooting

On November 30, 2021, a mass shooting occurred at Oxford High School. Four students were killed, and seven other people were injured. The suspected shooter is 15-year-old sophomore student Ethan Crumbley, who was taken into custody at the scene on the same day. Crumbley, who is being charged as an adult, faces both murder and terrorism charges. Crumbley's parents had met with school personnel regarding his behavior just three hours before the shooting. Crumbley's cell phone contained a video about the shooting plans that he made the night before the shooting. He was arraigned on December 1 on charges including terrorism and four counts of premeditated murder. Crumbley's parents were charged on December 3 with involuntary manslaughter for failing to secure the handgun used in the shooting. Both were arraigned on December 4 on their charges.

Following public scrutiny of the school's handling of reports about Crumbley's behavior, Throne announced that a third-party investigation of the incident would be conducted. He also said he would recommend a review of the district's "entire system" to school board members. On December 9, multiple survivors of the shooting filed two $100 million lawsuits against the district and its employees. At least one lawsuit alleges that school officials failed to stop the shooting and ignored several warning signs, such as threats posted to social media that had been brought to the school's attention.

Programs
As of 2017, the tuition for the Weiming program was $30,500 U.S. per student, a decline from the previous $40,000 per student. In turn, the district received $10,000 per student per year from Weiming.

Schools
Secondary schools
 Oxford High School
 Oxford Middle School

Elementary schools
 Daniel Axford
 Clear Lake
 Lakeville
 Leonard
 Oxford

Preschool
 Oxford Early Learning Center

Alternative
 Oxford Bridges High School
 Oxford Crossroads Day School

References

External links
 Oxford Community School District

School districts in Michigan
Education in Lapeer County, Michigan
Education in Oakland County, Michigan